Richard Eden may refer to:
 Richard Eden (translator), English alchemist and translator
 Richard Eden (actor), Canadian actor, screenwriter, and producer
 Richard J. Eden, British theoretical physicist